Treasure Hunters aka Master of Disaster is a Shaw Brothers film directed by Lau Kar Wing, starring Alexander Fu Sheng and Gordon Liu. It was released in 1981.

Plot

This kung-fu comedy combines Fu Sheng with his real-life brother Chang Chan Peng. The former stars as a wily kung-fu conman who uses all of his skills to trick an important official of his wares during the film's opening. Now on the run from the law, he runs into a wealthy yet bored young socialite who wants the chance to prove himself to his family. Bearing this in mind, the spoilt son proposes a venture to his new associate: to find the fabled treasure of Chan Po Chu and satisfy their respective needs for wealth and acceptance. With a tenuous agreement put into action, the two adventurers set out in search of the very sought after treasure. Also hunting down the Chan Po Chu booty is a small band of kung fu fighting monks and, the most fearsome of all, the ruthless Lord Mo. Through a series of intricate escapades and minor battles, the dynamic duo form a unique bond that helps them in their final confrontation with the dreaded Lord Mo. In the temple that is said to house Chan Po Chu's legacy, the various parties reveal their motives and the heroic forces are once and for all pitted against Lord Mok and his deadly female cohort.

Cast
 Alexander Fu Sheng as Chut Do Bo
 Gordon Liu as Mo Seung
 Chang Chan Peng as Jue Gow
 Wang Lung Wei as Lord Mok
 Wilson Tong as Cho Hung

References

External links 
 

Kung fu films
Hong Kong martial arts films
Shaw Brothers Studio films